Concubine Guo (died 1435), personal name Guo Ai, courtesy name Shanli (善理),  was a concubine of Xuande Emperor.

Biography
Concubine Guo was born as Guo Ai in Fengyang in present day Anhui province. She was selected into the palace because she was intelligent and quick witted, and excelled at poetry and prose. She died of illness in 1435, soon after she was selected into the palace. She was buried with the Xuande Emperor after his death.

Poetry
Well versed in poetry, Gao composed a poem in the ancient rhapsody (fu) style, for her previous life didn't seem to be happy, and probably due to illness. Later critics commented that this poem lamenting her fate was in the style of Cai Yan, a Chinese composer, poet, and writer who lived during the late Eastern Han dynasty of China. The way she expressed her feeling was neither overblown not undignified. The poem appears in different anthologies with slight textual variations. The variant titles are version of "Feeling Sorry for Myself When Seriously Ill in My Residence in the Capital" (jingdi bingji zi'ai/Bingley zi'ai/zi'ai).

References

Sources

Year of birth missing
1435 deaths
Ming dynasty imperial consorts
15th-century Chinese women
15th-century Chinese people
People from Fengyang